Fluoroacetamide is an organic compound based on acetamide with one fluorine atom replacing hydrogen on the methyl group. it is a metabolic poison which disrupts the citric acid cycle and was used as a rodenticide.

See also
 Sodium fluoroacetate

References

Rodenticides
Acetamides
Organofluorides
Respiratory toxins